Dhuizon is a commune in the Loir-et-Cher department in the region of Centre-Val de Loire, France.

It is located about 27.5 km (17.1 mi) from Romorantin.

Population

See also
Communes of the Loir-et-Cher department

References

Communes of Loir-et-Cher